Petya Minkova is a Bulgarian professional racing cyclist.

Major results
2022
National Road Championships
1st  Road Race
1st  Time Trial

2021
National Road Championships
1st  Road Race
2nd  Road Race

2020
National Road Championships
1st  Road Race
1st  Time Trial

References

Living people
Bulgarian female cyclists
Year of birth missing (living people)